Acyphoderes sexualis is a species of beetle in the family Cerambycidae. It was described by Linsley in 1934.

References

Acyphoderes
Beetles described in 1934